The Solidary Party (PSOL) is a co-operatist political party in Argentina, founded by banker and politician Carlos Heller in 2007. It is part of the Frente de Todos coalition, and was part of the kirchnerist Front for Victory from its foundation until the alliance's dissolution in 2019. The party was also previously aligned with New Encounter.

The party counts with minor representation in the Argentine Chamber of Deputies: Heller, who has sat as a National Deputy since 2019 representing the Autonomous City of Buenos Aires and served as member of the Chamber from 2009 to 2017 as well, and Eduardo Fernández of Córdoba.

Electoral performance

President

References

External links
Official website 

Political parties established in 2007
2007 establishments in Argentina
Center-left parties in Argentina
Kirchnerism
Cooperative parties